Mamuri may refer to:
 Mamuri, Fazl, Nishapur County, Razavi Khorasan Province, Iran
 Mamuri, Mazul, Nishapur County, Razavi Khorasan Province, Iran
 Mamoori, Pakistan